Segol  (modern , ; formerly , səḡôl) is a Hebrew niqqud vowel sign that is represented by three dots forming an upside down equilateral triangle "ֶ ". As such, it resembles an upside down therefore sign (a because sign) underneath a letter. In modern Hebrew, it indicates the phoneme  which is similar to  "e" in the English word sound in sell and is transliterated as an e.

In Modern Hebrew, segol makes the same sound as tzere, as does the Hataf Segol (   , "Reduced Segol"). The reduced (or ħataf) niqqud exist for segol, patah, and kamatz which contain a shva next to it.

Pronunciation
The following table contains the pronunciation and transliteration of the different segols in reconstructed historical forms and dialects using the International Phonetic Alphabet. The transcription in IPA is above and the transliteration is below.

The letters Bet "ב" and Het "ח" used in this table are only for demonstration. Any letter can be used.

In addition, a letter with a segol or tzere with a succeeding yod often makes the "ei" (also spelled "ey") sound such as in they or tape.

Vowel length comparison
By adding two vertical dots (shva), the vowel can be made very short. However, the vowels lengths are not manifested in Modern Hebrew.

Unicode encoding

Niqqud